The Journal of the Mexican Chemical Society  (formerly Revista de la Sociedad Química de Mexico) is a Mexican scientific journal in chemistry. It was founded in 1957 by the Mexican Chemical Society (Sociedad Química de México, A.C.). As of June 2014, the full text of the journal is freely available online on its homepage.

External links 

 Homepage of the journal: 
 Homepage of the Mexican Chemical Society: 

Chemistry journals